was a Japanese samurai of the mid-Edo period who was the founder of the Shimizu-Tokugawa family, one of the Gosankyō, the three lesser branches of the Tokugawa family. He was the second son of Tokugawa Ieshige, the ninth shōgun. His child-hood name was Manjiro (萬二郎). He married daughter of Prince Fushimi no Miya Sadatake.

Family
 Father: Tokugawa Ieshige
 Mother: Oitsu no Kata (1721-1789) later Anshoin
 Wife: Fushimi no Miya Sadako

References
 Nekhet's "World Nobility" page on the Shimizu-Tokugawa

1745 births
1795 deaths
Tokugawa clan